Lamé's stress ellipsoid is an alternative to Mohr's circle for the graphical representation of the stress state at a point. The surface of the ellipsoid represents the locus of the endpoints of all stress vectors acting on all planes passing through a given point in the continuum body. In other words, the endpoints of all stress vectors at a given point in the continuum body lie on the stress ellipsoid surface, i.e., the radius-vector from the center of the ellipsoid, located at the material point in consideration, to a point on the surface of the ellipsoid is equal to the stress vector on some plane passing through the point. In two dimensions, the surface is represented by an ellipse.

Once the equations of the ellipsoid is known, the magnitude of the stress vector can then be obtained for any plane passing through that point.

To determine the equation of the stress ellipsoid we consider the coordinate axes  taken in the directions of the principal axes, i.e., in a principal stress space. Thus, the coordinates of the stress vector  on a plane with normal unit vector  passing through a given point  is represented by

And knowing that  is a unit vector we have

 The first stress invariant  is directly proportional to the sum of the principal radii of the ellipsoid.
 The second stress invariant  is directly proportional to the sum of the three principal areas of the ellipsoid. The three principal areas are the ellipses on each principal plane.
 The third stress invariant  is directly proportional to the volume of the ellipsoid.
 If two of the three principal stresses are numerically equal the stress ellipsoid becomes an ellipsoid of revolution. Thus, two principal areas are ellipses and the third is a circle.
 If all of the principal stresses are equal and of the same sign, the stress ellipsoid becomes a sphere and any three perpendicular directions can be taken as principal axes.

The stress ellipsoid by itself, however, does not indicate the plane on which the given traction vector acts. Only for the case where the stress vector lies along one of the principal directions it is possible to know the direction of the plane, as the principal stresses act perpendicular to their planes. To find the orientation of any other plane we used the stress-director surface or stress director quadric represented by the equation

The stress represented by a radius-vector of the stress ellipsoid acts on a plane oriented parallel to the tangent plane to the stress-director surface at the point of its intersection with the radius-vector.

References

Bibliography

Classical mechanics
Materials science
Elasticity (physics)
Solid mechanics
Mechanics